Oleksandr Tomakh may refer to:
 Oleksandr Tomakh (footballer, born 1948), Ukrainian footballer and manager
 Oleksandr Tomakh (footballer, born 1969), Ukrainian footballer and manager
 Oleksandr Tomakh (footballer, born 1993), Ukrainian footballer